Ghazi or Gazi, a title given to Muslim warriors or champions and used by several Ottoman Sultans, may refer to:

Ghazi (warrior), an Islamic term for the Muslim soldier who crusades for their religion, land or territory

People

Given name
Ghazi of Iraq (1912–1939), King of the Kingdom of Iraq
Prince Ghazi bin Muhammad (born 1966), Jordanian prince and academic
Ghazi Aridi (born 1954), Lebanese politician
Gazi Evrenos (fl. 1345–1417), Ottoman military commander
Ghazi Abdul Rahman Al Gosaibi (1940–2010), Saudi Arabian politician, technocrat and novelist
Ghazi Honeini (born 1995), Lebanese footballer
Gazi Husrev-beg (1480–1541), Bosnian bey
Ghazi Khan, Baloch mercenary in Multan
Ghazi Saiyyad Salar Masud (1014-1034), Ghaznavid army general
Ghazi Muhammad (1793–1832), first imam of Dagestan, autonomous state of the Russian Federation
Ghazi Ajil al-Yawer (born 1958), former President of Iraq

Surname
Ahmad ibn Ibrahim al-Ghazi (1506-1543), Imam and General of the Adal Sultanate
Badr Al Din Abu Ghazi (1920–1983), Egyptian art critic and writer
Emad Abu Ghazi (born 1955), Egyptian scholar
Ertuğrul Gazi (?-1280), father of Osman Gazi
Habibullah Ghazi (1891–1929), Emir of Afghanistan
Osman Gazi (1299-1326), founder of the Ottoman dynasty

Places

Afghanistan
Ghazi Stadium, multi-purpose stadium in Kabul

Greece
Gazi, Athens, a neighborhood in Athens, Greece
Gazi, Crete, a town in Greece

Iran
Ghazi, Iran, a city in North Khorasan Province
Gazi, Hormozgan, a village in Hormozgan Province, Iran
Ghazi Rural District, an administrative subdivision of North Khorasan Province, Iran
Gazi, Sistan and Baluchestan, a village in Sistan and Baluchestan Province, Iran

Kosovo
Gazimestan, a memorial site and monument dedicated to Gazi Evrenos in Pristina

Pakistan
Ghazi, Khyber Pakhtunkhwa, a town
Dera Ghazi Khan District

Turkey
Gaziantep, a city in Turkey
Gazi University

Other uses
PNS Ghazi, a Pakistan Navy submarine sunk in the Indo-Pakistani War of 1971, formerly known as USS Diablo (SS-479)
The Ghazi Attack, also known as Ghazi, a 2017 Indian war film

See also
Gazi (disambiguation)
Khasi (disambiguation)
Razzia (military)

Bengali Muslim surnames